Whitefield Christian Schools is a private educational institution registered with the Ontario Ministry of Education, established in 1989. 

Influential people include:

 Dr. Larry Saunders - administrator and pastor of Toronto Free Presbyterian Church.
 Dr. Frank McClelland -  president and pastor emeritus of Toronto Free Presbyterian Church. He has written several books and is the editor of The Canadian Revivalist.
.

References

Private schools in Toronto